Azteca cordincola is a species of ant in the genus Azteca. Described by Forel in 1921, the species is endemic to Bolivia.

References

Azteca (genus)
Hymenoptera of South America
Insects described in 1921